Muhannad Adnan Darjal (born 1 January 1986) is an Iraqi footballer .

Personal life
He is the son of the famous defender Adnan Dirjal.

References

External links
 

Iraqi footballers
Iraqi expatriate footballers
1986 births
Living people
Al-Markhiya SC players
Al-Khor SC players
Al-Wakrah SC players
Al-Rayyan SC players
Mesaimeer SC players
Al-Shahania SC players
Al-Shamal SC players
Qatar Stars League players
Qatari Second Division players
Association football defenders